This is a list of the 24 delegates to the European Parliament for the Czech Republic in the 1999 to 2004 session.

In the transitional period between the entry of the Czech Republic into the European Union on 1 May 2004 and the elections to the European Parliament in 2004, the Czech Republic was represented in the European Parliament by 24 deputies delegated already in the spring of 2003 by the Chamber of Deputies of the Czech Republic and the Senate of the Czech Republic. Their mandates expired after deputies elected in regular elections assumed their mandates at the first plenary meeting.

From spring 2003 to 1 May 2004, they had observer status, i.e. they could only speak in committees and could not vote (however, they received information about the proceedings of the European Parliament). From 1 May 2004, they became full members of the European Parliament .

Observers 
This is a list of the delegates of the European Parliament from the Czech Republic in the period from 1 May 2004 to 19 July 2004.

References

See also 

2004
List
Czech Republic